"Better Believe" is a song by Palestinian-Canadian rapper Belly, Canadian singer the Weeknd, and American rapper Young Thug. It was released on July 22, 2021, through XO Records and Republic Records as the third single from Belly's third studio album, See You Next Wednesday. The song was produced by Zaytoven, DannyBoyStyles, and The ANMLS.

Background
On the song, The Weeknd handles the first verse, pre-chorus, and chorus, while Belly handles the second verse and Young Thug raps the third and final verse. Before the song, each artist had collaborated with each other in the past. Belly and The Weeknd are both signed to XO Records, which is led by the latter; they have worked together twice previously, both on Belly's singles, "Might Not" and "What You Want", released in 2015 and 2018, respectively. Belly and Young Thug have teamed up once before, on the former's track, "Consuela" alongside Moroccan-American rapper Zack, released in 2016. The Weeknd and Young Thug have also united once prior to "Better Believe", on the remix of the former's single, "Reminder" alongside American rapper ASAP Rocky, released in 2017.

Music video
A music video for the song was released to Belly's YouTube channel alongside the song on July 22, 2021. The "glossy, action-packed music video" was directed by Christian Breslauer. The video is the one of two parts, and it includes self-driving expensive cars. Belly is burning along with some buildings that are on fire, The Weeknd drives a BMW and is seen later standing with McLaren P1 drifting behind him while Young Thug is seen with a slime green tank truck.

Credits and personnel
Credits adapted from Tidal.

 Belly – vocals, songwriting
 The Weeknd – vocals, songwriting
 Young Thug – vocals, songwriting
 Zaytoven – production, songwriting
 DannyBoyStyles – production, songwriting, keyboards, programming
 The ANMLS – production, songwriting
 Richard Munoz – production, songwriting
 Faris Al-Majed – production, songwriting, recording engineer, studio personnel
 Shin Kamiyama – recording engineer, studio personnel
 Fabian Marasciullo – mixing engineer, studio personnel
 Colin Leonard – mastering engineer, studio personnel

Charts

Release history

References

External links
 
 

 

 
2021 songs
2021 singles
Belly (rapper) songs
The Weeknd songs
Young Thug songs
Songs written by Belly (rapper)
Songs written by the Weeknd
Songs written by Young Thug
Songs written by Zaytoven
Song recordings produced by Zaytoven
XO (record label) singles
Republic Records singles